Mock combat involves the execution of combative actions without intent to harm. Participants can engage in such sparring for ritual, training, recreational or performance reasons. The nature of mock combat can vary from realistic to symbolic.
Mock combat can be classified into choreographed and unchoreographed forms.

Unchoreographed
 Display behaviour in tournament species
 Threat display
 Ritual battle
 Tinku
 Battle reenactment
 Military simulation or war games
 Sparring

Choreographed
 Stage combat
 Theatrical fencing
 Cinematic fencing
 Arranged performance fighting
 War dance
 Capoeira
 Juego de maní
 Kailao
 Kata in Japanese martial arts
 Hyung, or poomsae  (in Korean martial arts)
Professional Wrestling

References